The Masquerade Bandit is a 1926 American silent Western film directed by Robert De Lacey and starring Tom Tyler, Dorothy Dunbar and Ethan Laidlaw.

Cast
 Tom Tyler as Jeff Morton 
 Dorothy Dunbar as Molly Marble 
 Ethan Laidlaw as Duncan 
 Alfred Hewston as Pat 
 Ray Childs as Spike 
 Raye Hampton as Kate Mahoney 
 Earl Haley as Tony 
 Frankie Darro as Tim Marble

References

Bibliography
 Munden, Kenneth White. The American Film Institute Catalog of Motion Pictures Produced in the United States, Part 1. University of California Press, 1997.

External links
 

1926 films
1926 Western (genre) films
Films directed by Robert De Lacey
American black-and-white films
Film Booking Offices of America films
Silent American Western (genre) films
1920s English-language films
1920s American films